Fortuna Becicherecu Mic may refer to:

 ACS Fortuna Becicherecu Mic, a men's football club in Becicherecu Mic, Romania.
 ACS Fortuna Becicherecu Mic (women), a women's football club in Becicherecu Mic, Romania.